Radio 98 is a youth-oriented radio station in Montenegro. Its headquarters are in Podgorica.

References
The IFJ Conference, Budapest, February 15, 2002: Public Service Broadcasting in Transition / Croatia, Montenegro, Slovenia – A paper submitted by the Peace Institute* in Ljubljana for the IFJ conference, Budapest, February 15, 2002. Authors: Damir Matković, Croatia, Saąa Brajović and Jadranka Vojvodić (chapter on new legislation), Montenegro and Brankica Petković, Slovenia.

External links

Radio stations in Montenegro
Mass media in Podgorica